Airntully is a village in the Scottish council area of Perth and Kinross, which is to the west of the River Tay, 8 miles (11 km) north of Perth. In the 18th Century, it thrived on cottage weaving. The anonymous writer of the Statistical Account of the Parish of Kinclaven in the 1790s was impressed by the  state of the village, commenting that "The county of Perth, were it possessed of no other spot of a similar description, should allow Arntully [sic] to remain in its present state, that a proper contrast might be drawn, between a neat modern village, and one upon the old construction."    It retains a relatively unspoilt charm today. 

Villages in Perth and Kinross